Spafford may refer to:

People
 Belle S. Spafford (1895–1982), American president of the Relief Society
 Gene Spafford (born 1956), American professor of computer science at Purdue University
 Horatio Spafford (1828–1888), American author of the hymn "It Is Well With My Soul"
 Michael Spafford (1935-2022), American artist
 Patricia Spafford Smith (1925–2002), American politician
 Suzy Spafford {born 1945), American cartoonist, creator of "Suzy'z Zoo"

Places

United States
 Spafford, Minnesota
 Spafford, New York

Culture and arts
 Spafford (band), band from Prescott, Arizona, United States